The National Geographical Organization of Iran or National Geographical Organization of the Armed Forces of Iran (or ) is an Iranian government agency affiliated to the Ministry of Defence and Armed Forces Logistics of Iran, which has been established to prepare quick and accurate access spatial information of the country and other areas required by the Armed Forces of Iran.

History
The National Geographical Organization of Iran was officially founded in 1951 to prepare maps and survey geographical activities. Of course, origin of this mapping organization and formation of surveying and cartography branches, was laid in 1921, and in the course of its evolution, it performed responsibilities in accordance with the needs, missions and organizational duties. Finally, it is identified as the National Geographical Organization of Iran or National Geographical Organization of the Armed Forces of Iran. Currently, the National Geographical Organization of Iran, along with the National Cartographic Center, conducts affairs related to surveying and preparation and production of spatial information, but matters related to military maps, national borders and geographical services required by the Armed Forces are performed only through the National Geographical Organization of Iran.

Activities
As the first country in the Middle East, in 1955, the National Geographical Organization of Iran carried out the first analog aerial photography from all over of Iran with a scale of 1: 50,000 and then, using conversion devices (mechanical) and performing engineering steps, was able to prepare and extract topographic maps. Due to the technology conditions that were used at that time, the preparation of the map lasted until 1971 and about 2550 sheets of topographic maps were prepared and produced at a scale of 1: 50,000.

In recent years, the National Geographical Organization of Iran has been able to change the aerial photography system to take the first digital aerial photography with new systems (ULTRA CAM D digital cameras) and done digital aerial photography projects for many cities of Iran.

Among the capabilities and duties of the National Geographical Organization of Iran, the following can be mentioned:

 Demarcation of the borders of the country
 Production of spatial information in the national and regional areas
 Design, implementation and monitoring of satellite and classical geodetic operations
 Perform processing, classifying and interpreting aerial and satellite images
 Review old maps with different methods of using satellite images and aerial photography
 Preparation of thematic and prominent maps and execution of all stages of cartography
 Preparation and printing of photo maps (using aerial photographs and satellite images)
 Collection and compilation of geographical information
 Design and printing (including: typesetting, design, assembly, lithography and printing) types of books and scientific and technical publications
 Performing various activities related to remote sensing
 implementation of Geographic information system (GIS)
 Design and implementation of hydrographic operations
 Preparation and construction of scale model from facilities, equipment and natural land features
 Design and conversion of all photogrammetric devices from classical (analog) system to analytical and digital system
 Holding various advanced courses (theoretical and practical) in the field of surveying engineering

Also, the Surveying Technical School of the Geographical Organization is affiliated with this organization, which present the surveying field in undergraduate and associate degrees.

See also
 National Cartographic Center of Iran
 Ministry of Defence and Armed Forces Logistics (Iran)
 Geology of Iran
 National Geoscience Database of Iran

References

External links
 National Geographical Organization of Iran on Google Map
 Armed Forces Geographical Organization
 Examples of the Geographic Services Provided by the Geographical Organization of the Armed Forces of Iran

Ministry of Defence and Armed Forces Logistics of the Islamic Republic of Iran
Geographic data and information organisations in Iran
Geology of Iran
Government agencies of Iran
Technical drawing
Surveying
National mapping agencies